Honduran coup d'état may refer to:
 1956 Honduran coup d'état
 1963 Honduran coup d'état
 1972 Honduran coup d'état
 1975 Honduran coup d'état
 1978 Honduran coup d'état
 2009 Honduran coup d'état